John Scythopolita (ca. 536–550), also known as "the Scholasticus", bishop of Scythopolis  in Palestine, where Beit She'an is today, was a Byzantine theologian and lawyer adhering to neo-Chalcedonian theology.

He is famous for several works (lost) against Monophysite heresy: his major one is a treatise written ca. 530, defending the theory of "dioenergism", against his contemporary Severus of Antioch. Another work attacked the heretic Eutyches, one of the founders of Monophysitism.

We have some data about him by Photius, learned bishop of Byzantium.

Hans Urs von Balthasar suggested than John was the author of much of Maximus the Confessor's scholia.

A recent theory by Byzantinist Carlo Maria Mazzucchi suggests that John of Scythopolis' was aware that the Corpus Dionysiacum was a forgery and that his awareness is revealed by his extensive marginal commentary—despite the fact that John's commentary apparently defends the originality of the Corpus.

Notes 

Byzantine theologians
6th-century Byzantine people
6th-century Christian theologians
6th-century Byzantine writers
People from Beit She'an